James A. Adkins (born 1954) is an American retired senior military officer and former cabinet-level official who served as Maryland's adjutant general and secretary of the Maryland Department of Veterans Affairs.

Early life and education 
Adkins was born in 1954 in Cambridge, Maryland, and grew up on the Eastern Shore of Maryland. He earned a Bachelor of Arts degree in sociology from the University at Albany, SUNY and a Master of Arts degree history from Washington College. His senior military education included the United States Army Command and General Staff College, United States Army War College.

Career 
Prior to entering the United States Army, he served two years with the Dorchester County Sheriff's Office

His military career spanned nearly 40 years of service in both the enlisted and officer ranks. He served at nearly every level of command and in various staff assignments. Adkins graduated from the Defense Language Institute's Russian Language Program in Monterey, California, and served in intelligence, infantry, and cavalry assignments in the United States and abroad. After the collapse of the Soviet Union, he assisted the Republic of Estonia in its integration into NATO. His military career took him to Japan, Germany, Estonia, Bosnia and Herzegovina, Kosovo, Kuwait, Qatar, Iraq, Egypt and Afghanistan.

Adkins’ military decorations include the Distinguished Service Medal, the Legion of Merit, the Maryland Distinguished Service Cross, the Republic of Estonia's Order of the Cross of the Eagle 2nd Class and the Order of the White Cross.

Adkins was awarded an honorary doctorate by the American University in Bosnia and Herzegovina in recognition of his service to that country.

In 2016, he was selected for induction into the Defense Language Institute's Hall of Fame in Monterey, California. Adkins was inducted into the Maryland State Firemen's Association Hall of Fame in 2014. The Daughters of the American Revolution in 2020 presented General Adkins with their highest award for native-born Americans, the DAR Medal of Honor.

He is a member of numerous organizations including the American Legion, Veterans of Foreign Wars, Disabled American Veterans, American Veterans (AMVETS), Vietnam Veterans of America, Military Officers Association of America, U.S. Army War College Foundation and Alumni Affairs, U.S. Naval Institute, U.S. Naval Academy Alumni Association and Foundation, 2nd Armored Division Association, 29th Infantry Division Association, Jamestowne Society, National Society Sons of the American Revolution, Society of the War of 1812, Rotary Club of Cambridge, and the Maryland Chiefs of Police Association. Adkins served as the President, Maryland Society of the Sons of the American Revolution from 2018 to 2019.

Major awards and decorations 
Distinguished Service Medal
Legion of Merit
Meritorious Service Medal (United States) (with 1 Bronze Oak Leaf Cluster)
Army Commendation Medal (with 2 Bronze Oak Leaf Clusters)
Army Achievement Medal
Army Good Conduct Medal
Army Reserve Component Achievement Medal (with 4 Bronze Oak Leaf Clusters)
National Defense Service Medal (with one Bronze Service Star)
Armed Forces Reserve Medal (with Bronze Hourglass Device)
Army Service Ribbon
State of Maryland Distinguished Service Cross (with 1 Bronze Oak Leaf Cluster)
State of Maryland Meritorious Service Medal
State of Maryland Commendation Medal
Maryland National Guard Recruiting Medal
Maryland National Guard State Service Medal (with two Bronze Botonees)
Virginia National Guard Bronze Star Medal
State of North Carolina Distinguished Service Medal
NSSAR Silver Good Citizenship Award
NSSAR Patriot Medal
NSSAR Silver Roger Sherman Medal
NSSAR Distinguished Service Medal
NSSAR Military Service Medal
NSSAR Meritorious Service Medal
MDSSAR Maryland 400 Distinguished Service Medal
Certificate of Congressional Recognition

Other achievements 
 Order of the Cross of the Eagle 2nd Class from the President of the Republic of Estonia
 White Cross Order of the Home Guard-Republic of Estonia
 Presentation Pistol from the Presidency of Bosnia and Herzegovina 
 Honorary Doctorate from the American University in Bosnia and Herzegovina 
 The Ambassador's Award for International Cooperation presented by US Ambassador to Estonia
 Hall of Fame Award, Maryland State Firemen's Association
 Jeffries Carey National Achievement Award, African American Patriots Consortium
 American Flag Foundation's Patriotism Award
 PNC A. Leo Anderson Memorial Free State Award of Excellence by AMVETS, Maryland
 Superintendent's Salute, Maryland State Police
 Hall of Fame, Defense Language Institute  
 Outstanding Military Service Award, Advisory Council for Bosnia and Herzegovina 
 Seven Seals Award, Department of Defense Employer Support of the Guard and Reserve 
 President, Maryland Society of the Sons of the American Revolution - 2018
 Awarded a certificate of completion for the General and Flag Officer Homeland Security Executive Seminar Program, April 2012, John F. Kennedy School of Government at Harvard University, Executive Education.

See also

A History of the Adjutants General of Maryland

References

This article incorporates public domain material from the State of Maryland document Adjutant General of Maryland

External links

1954 births
Living people
People from Cambridge, Maryland
University at Albany, SUNY alumni
Washington College alumni
State cabinet secretaries of Maryland
National Guard (United States) generals
United States Army generals
Recipients of the Legion of Merit
Defense Language Institute alumni